Adscript (from Latin , "on" or "to", and , "to write") means something written after, as opposed to subscript which means written under.

A laborer was called an "adscript of the soil" when he could be sold or transferred with the land, as under feudal villeinage and with serfdom in the Russian Empire until 1861.

See also
Iota adscript

Notes

Typography
Feudalism